Avana Ivan!? is a 1962 Indian Tamil-language thriller film directed by S. Balachander. The film was an adaptation of the 1951 American film A Place in the Sun, itself adapted from the novel An American Tragedy written by Theodore Dreiser. The novel itself was based on the Gillette murder case that happened in the early 20th century.

Plot 

Kumar kills his wife Sumathi to marry another woman, Vaasanthi. The murder is witnessed by two children, who go for a picnic along with other children who later expose the truth. At the last the murderer is arrested and taken away by the police; he winks at the children who exposed him and says "ta ta".

Cast 

Male cast
 S. Balachander as Kumar
 Ramesh as Kannan
 Master Sridhar as Venu
 V. S. Raghavan as Rajaram
 Serukalathur Sama as Sadhanandam
 Pattom Sadan as Assistant
 Kottapuli Jayaraman as Assistant
 P. D. Sambandam as Teacher
 Vidwan Ve. Lakshmanan as Inspector Rajan
 S. G. Eswar as Eswar

Female cast
 Vasanthi as Jamuna
 Baby Padmini as Meena
 Lakshmi Rajam as Sumathi
 C. K. Saraswathi as Parvatham
 S. N. Lakshmi as Amrthavalli
 Thilakam Rajakumari as Valli
 Shanthini as Ponnamma

Production 
The film was an adaptation of the American film A Place in the Sun, based on the novel An American Tragedy written by Theodore Dreiser. The novel was inspired by the Gillette murder case that shook America in the early part of the 20th century. The original film was a major success in India. S. Balachander was much impressed with the film and tried to remake the film in Tamil, thus making his production debut. He named his company S. B. Creations, the first time the word "Creations" was used in a South Indian film for a film production company.

Soundtrack 
The soundtrack was composed by S. Balachander. Lyrics by Vidhvan Ve. Lakshmanan.

Release and reception 
The Indian Express wrote, "In story, treatment, music and in the style of dialogue delivery, Avana Ivan? is said to set a new pattern in film-making". Before the making of the film, it was reported that Balachandar sent blank cheques to the cast and crew. The film failed to make an impact at the box office.

References

External links 
 

1960s Tamil-language films
1960s thriller films
1962 films
Films based on American novels
Films directed by S. Balachander
Indian remakes of American films
Indian thriller films
Films scored by S. Balachander